Jay Chou's Bedtime Stories is the fourteenth studio album by Taiwanese singer Jay Chou, released on 24 June 2016, by JVR Music.

The album was nominated for three Golden Melody Awards.

About the songs 
"Bedtime Stories" (床邊故事)

The concept song for this album. The lyrics are about various bedtime stories being told to children. The song is a mixture of rap, R&B, and hip-hop. The music video shows various Renaissance paintings.

"Let's Go" (說走就走)

This song incorporates the elements of American Cowboy folk music into the structure of rock music. The lyrics speak about one's urge to travel freely without boundaries.

"A Little Bit" (一點點)

A slower song incorporating piano and strings. A typical heart-break song from Jay Chou. The lyrics speak of a man who never paid any attention to his girlfriend, who then eventually leaves him.

"Lover of Past Life" (前世情人)

A song dedicated to his daughter, the lyrics describe Jay Chou's unceasing love for his daughter and what's in store for his daughter's future. The song is in 3/4 time, and is a R&B rock beat.

"Hero" (英雄)

A pumped up rock song with heavily incorporated electric guitar. This song was made for the online multiplayer game, League of Legends.

"Shouldn't Be" (不該)

A duet between Jay Chou and A-mei. This song begins with piano, but later incorporates electronic sounds. The lyrics are about how fate does not allow two lovers to be together.  It was featured in Ice Fantasy as the opening theme. 

"Turkish Ice Cream" (土耳其冰淇淋)

This song cannot exactly be placed into one genre. It is a mixture of rock, hip-hop, and a tinge of middle eastern elements, and the lyrics emphasise how Jay Chou can do anything he wants with his songs. The music video features NBA star and friend, Jeremy Lin.

"Confession Balloon" (告白氣球)

This song is a catchy, upbeat tune with a sweet vibe. The lyrics speak of someone wanting to confess their love to another. The music video is set in Paris, with clips of Jay Chou singing along the Seine River.

"Now You See Me"

This song was featured in the Hollywood film Now You See Me 2, which Jay Chou made a cameo in. This song blends Chinese folk elements with a modern hip-hop rhythm. It also influenced by the Arabian or Indian style.

"Failure at Love" (愛情廢柴)

Another soft, heartbreak ballad song. Jay Chou uses a deeper voice for this song, akin to a slightly drunk vibe. The music videos features Jay Chou walking through Prague in winter.

Track listing

Awards

Chart

References

External links
  Jay Chou discography@JVR Music

2016 albums
Jay Chou albums
Sony Music Taiwan albums